Bell Hill mill tramway was a bush tramway at Bell Hill in the Moana Region of the Grey District on the West Coast of New Zealand.

History 
The Bell Hill mill was owned by Brownlee and Company and opened in the second decade of the 20th century. At times the mill closed down due to lack of water for the mill's boilers and for dampening down sawdust. In 1947 the mill was threatened by fire.

Locomotives 
The Johnson locomotive was built in Invercargill in 1906.

External links 
 Lake Brunner Sawmilling Coy's Mill at Bell Hill 
 "Barclay" bush train, Lake Brunner sawmill, 1960
 Bush loco crash, Jack Bros., tram
 Log hauling tramway from Lake Haupiri to Bell Hill mill
 Roads
 Brownlies Band Mill at Bell Hill

Further literature 
 Daniel Reese: Was It All Cricket? George Allen and Unwin Ltd, 1948, London.

References 

3 ft 6 in gauge railways in New Zealand
Logging railways in New Zealand
Transport buildings and structures in the West Coast, New Zealand
Rail transport in the West Coast, New Zealand
Grey District